Natalie Figueroa is an American politician and educator serving as a member of the New Mexico House of Representatives from the 30th district, which includes a portion of Bernalillo County.

Education 
Figueroa earned a Bachelor of Arts degree from Stanford University and a Master of Education from the University of California, Los Angeles.

Career 
Prior to entering politics, Figueroa worked as a Spanish teacher in Albuquerque. In 2016, she ran unsuccessfully for a seat in the New Mexico House of Representatives. She ran again in 2018, succeeding incumbent Republican and House Minority Leader, Nate Gentry, who did not run for re-election.

References 

Hispanic and Latino American state legislators in New Mexico
Hispanic and Latino American women in politics
Democratic Party members of the New Mexico House of Representatives
Stanford University alumni
University of California, Los Angeles alumni
Year of birth missing (living people)
Living people
21st-century American women